Aripuanã River is a river in the Mato Grosso and Amazonas states in north-western Brazil. It is a tributary of the Madeira River in the Amazon Basin. The town of Novo Aripuanã is located on its banks where it merges into the Madeira River. The town of Aripuanã is also on its banks, but on the upper (southern) section of the river.

The Aripuanã is a clearwater river.

Course

In Mato Grosso to the south of the border with Amazonas the river defines the western boundary of the  Igarapés do Juruena State Park, created in 2002.
To the north of the Amazonas border it flows through the  Aripuanã Sustainable Development Reserve, created in 2005.

Further north in Amazonas the Trans-Amazonian Highway (BR-230) crosses the Aripuanã.
North of the highway the river flows through the  Aripuanã National Forest, a sustainable development unit created in 2016 in the last week before the provisional removal of president Dilma Rousseff.
It then flows through the Juma Sustainable Development Reserve before meeting the Madeira.

There are four dams on the river (Dardanelos Dam, Faxinal I and Faxinal II at Aripuanã town, and Juína Dam west of Juína) and a fifth is planned (Prainha Dam on the middle Aripuanã River). These have impacted the environment and caused conflicts with indigenous people.

See also
List of rivers of Amazonas
List of rivers of Mato Grosso

References

Sources

Rivers of Amazonas (Brazilian state)
Rivers of Mato Grosso